Smiltene Parish is an administrative unit of Smiltene Municipality, Latvia.

Towns, villages and settlements of Smiltene Parish 
  - parish administrative center

References 

Parishes of Latvia
Smiltene Municipality